Crucifixion is a c.1457-1458 tempera on panel painting by Paolo Uccello, now in the Museo Thyssen-Bornemisza in Madrid. Its dating is debated - some date it to the same period in the Cappella dell'Assunta (1435) due to the similarities between the pose of the Virgin Mary in Crucifixion and the woman climbing the stairs in the chapel fresco of The Birth of the Virgin, whilst others date it to a later period after his return to Padua, where he was influenced by the work of Donatello.

References

Paintings by Paolo Uccello
Uccello
1458 paintings
Paintings in the Thyssen-Bornemisza Museum